Snoddy was a six-part Scottish television sitcom, written and created by Johnny Crawford, that first broadcast on BBC One Scotland on 13 March 2002. The series, which aired at 10:35pm on Wednesdays, starred Gregor Fisher of Rab C Nesbitt fame as DCI Samuel J. Snoddy, the head of Scotland's Elite Crime Squad, who is obsessed with spending more time playing golf abroad rather than fighting crimes.

Only a single series of six episodes was broadcast, and the series was never shown outside of Scotland. The series was regarded as unsuccessful and was axed by BBC bosses following poor ratings. The series was heavily promoted in and around the Glasgow area, with a number of billboard posters portraying the tagline "it's a Hotel Oscar Oscar Tango of a show” being put up around the city. Notably, the series has never been made available on DVD.

Production
Snoddy was Johnny Crawford's first television writing credit, eventually being produced by The Comedy Unit for BBC One Scotland after first being offered to Channel 4 in 1998. Producer Colin Gilbert described Snoddy as Crawford's "rich, refreshing, and tangential left-field vision". Scripts for the series were subject to redrafting, with Gilbert commenting, "It's been a challenge for us to control everything into half-hour episodes that make narrative sense and are still funny. John's certainly had to work at making Snoddy just that bit easier for folk to follow, re-writing and re-writing, but he's become a much better writer as he's gone along."

Cast
 Gregor Fisher as DCI Samuel J. Snoddy
 Dawn Steele as Laura Bonney
 Hugh Ross as Chief Inspector Chalmers
 Gavin Mitchell as DC Jackie Murdoch
 James Young as DC Wilson
 Brian Pettifer as Professor Baxter
 Tom Urie as Captain Ortego
 Alan McCafferty as PC MacCubbin
 Billy Riddoch as PC Greig

Episodes

References

External links

Scottish television sitcoms
2002 Scottish television series debuts
2002 Scottish television series endings
2000s Scottish television series
BBC Scotland television shows
BBC television sitcoms
English-language television shows
Television shows set in Scotland